Tung Chung Fort is a fort located near Tung Chung, on Lantau Island, in Hong Kong. Close to Tung Chung Road, the fort is surrounded by the villages of Sheung Ling Pei and Ha Ling Pei. It has a companion Tung Chung Battery on the coast.

History
Tung Chung Fort was originally built in the Shun Hei era (11741189) of the Southern Song dynasty.  Smugglers on Lantau Island smuggled salt from the island to Canton City and attacked the government of the city.  The government sent a navy led by King Leok Chin to fight against the smugglers. Three hundred soldiers were stationed in Tung Chung and built the Tung Chung Fort. After three years of peace, the soldiers were called back and 150 of them were transferred to build Kowloon Walled City, in which they later stayed.

During the Qing dynasty, many pirates, including the well known Cheung Po Tsai, chose the bay of Tung Chung as their base and made use of the fort. The Qing Government recovered the fort after the surrender of Cheung Po Tsai. In 1832 (or 1817 alternatively) the fort was rebuilt and garrisoned by the Right Battalion of Tai Peng to defend the coast from pirates until the lease of New Territories to Britain in 1898. The fort was then abandoned.

During World War II, the Imperial Japanese Army occupied the fort.

Tung Chung Fort went through several transformations later. It served as a police station and then as Wa Ying College. Now, it is the base for the Rural Committee Office and the Tung Chung Public School.

In 1979, it was declared a monument and was refurbished in 1988.

Features

There are six still intact old muzzle-loading cannons, each resting on a cement base with enclosures made of granite blocks, which measure . Three arched gateways, each engraved with a Chinese inscription, are spaced along the walls.

Transportation
The fort can be reached from Mui Wo (Silvermine Bay) bus terminal by taking the no. 3 bus to the Tung Chung terminus and about a half mile walk from the bus stop in the direction of the fort. The fort can also be reached by taking the no. 13 or 14 bus and MTR.  Permission is required to drive into the park.

See also
 Tung Chung Battery
 List of buildings and structures in Hong Kong
 List of forts

External links

 Tung Chung Fort
 Tung Chung Fort (in Chinese)

Archaeological sites in Hong Kong
Declared monuments of Hong Kong
Tung Chung
Forts in Hong Kong